Wanne observation tower is one of the oldest lattice towers in the world. It was built in 1888 by the observation tower cooperative on the  Wanne mountain tub east of Villingen, in the Schwarzwald-Baar district in southern Baden-Württemberg, Germany. It was erected by bell foundry Grueninger of Villingen.
The  tower has three platforms and is remarkable for its uncommon design, as it has an octagonal cross section.

See also 
 List of towers

External links 
 

Observation towers in Baden-Württemberg
Towers completed in 1888
Villingen-Schwenningen
Buildings and structures in Schwarzwald-Baar-Kreis